Dwight D. Eisenhower is a bronze sculpture depicting the former U.S. president of the same name by Jim Brothers, installed in the U.S. Capitol's rotunda, in Washington, D.C., as part of the National Statuary Hall Collection. The statue was gifted by the U.S. state of Kansas in 2003, and replaced one depicting George Washington Glick.

See also
 2003 in art
 List of memorials to Dwight D. Eisenhower
 List of sculptures of presidents of the United States

References

External links
 

2003 establishments in Washington, D.C.
Bronze sculptures in Washington, D.C.
Monuments and memorials in Washington, D.C.
Eisenhower
Sculptures of men in Washington, D.C.
Statues of Dwight D. Eisenhower
Statues of military officers